Roen is a surname. Notable people with the surname include:

Allard Roen (1921–2008), American businessman 
Clara 't Roen (died 1524), Flemish Lutheran
Katrina Roen, New Zealand psychologist and sociologist

See also
Roeg
Røen